Jerome E. Steever (January 7, 1880 – January 5, 1957) was an American water polo player who competed in the 1904 Summer Olympics. He was born in Wisconsin and died in San Diego, California. In the 1904 Olympics he won a silver medal as a member of Chicago Athletic Association team.

References

External links
profile

1880 births
1957 deaths
American male water polo players
Water polo players at the 1904 Summer Olympics
Olympic silver medalists for the United States in water polo
Medalists at the 1904 Summer Olympics

ru:Водное поло на летних Олимпийских играх 1904#Составы команд